Dieter Hulliger (born 1946) is a Swiss orienteering competitor. He received an individual bronze medal at the 1970 World Orienteering Championships, and a silver medal in relay in 1972.

References

1946 births
Living people
Swiss orienteers
Male orienteers
Foot orienteers
World Orienteering Championships medalists
20th-century Swiss people